La Jeanne d'Arc de Drancy are a French football club based in Drancy, a suburb of Paris. The club was founded in 1903. As of the 2020–21 season, the club plays in the Championnat National 3, the fifth division of French football.

Current status
Jeanne d'Arc de Drancy have achieved numerous honors in the amateur section of French football in the 21st century resulting in the club reaching the Championnat de France amateur for the 2009-10 season. In 2003, the club won the Ligue d'Excellence of its region and, the following year, won its region's Ligue d'Promotion. The next year, the club achieved promotion again, winning the Division d'Honneur Régionale and followed this up with another promotion run, this time winning the Division Supérieure Régionale meaning Drancy had reached the 6th division of French football, the Division d'Honneur. In 2007, the club finished 2nd achieving promotion to the CFA 2, however they were relegated back down after they failed to meet the league's financial requirements and expectations. A year later, Drancy won the league and were accepted into CFA 2 and proceeded to win its group after just one year in the league and were accepting into the Championnat de France amateur.

In 2018, Jeanne d'Arc de Drancy were promoted to Championnat National for the first time in the club's history after finishing first in the Championnat National 2. After just one season they were relegated back to National 2 on 3 May 2019. A further relegation to National 3 followed when the 2019–20 season was ended early due to the COVID-19 pandemic.

Coupe de France success
Despite the club's amateur status, they have played well in France's most prestigious cup competition, the Coupe de France. From 2003 to 2007, Drancy reached as far as the 8th round, where Ligue 1 clubs enter. In 2006, they reached the Round of 32 before losing to professional club Metz. Twice consecutively, in 2011 and 2012, Drancy reached Round of 16.

Current squad

References

Association football clubs established in 1903
1903 establishments in France
Football clubs in Paris